Drugs, Inc. is an American documentary style television series on the National Geographic Channel that explores global narcotics production and trafficking. The series features drug dealers, recreational users, and addicts, as well as professionals in the fields of substance abuse, drug rehabilitation, and criminal justice. Interview subjects frequently have their voices changed or hide their faces behind masks or bandanas, in order to avoid public exposure or arrest by the local authorities.

Seasons 1 and 2 focused on a specific drug, while seasons 3, 4, 5, 6, and 7 investigated multiple drugs in each city or location.

A sister series, Underworld, Inc., focuses on criminal activity of specific types and/or in individual cities.

Episodes

Season 1 (2010)

Season 2 (2012)

Season 3 (2012)

Season 4 (2013)

Season 5 (2014)

Season 6 (2014)

Season 7 (2015-16)

Season 8 (2018)

See also
 War on Drugs
 Prohibition of drugs
 Arguments for and against drug prohibition

References

External links
 

National Geographic (American TV channel) original programming
2010 American television series debuts
Television shows about drugs
Television series about illegal drug trade
Works about Colombian drug cartels
Works about Mexican drug cartels